High-confinement mode, or H-mode, is an operating mode possible in toroidal magnetic confinement fusion devices mostly tokamaks, but also in stellarators.
In this mode the plasma is more stable and better confined.

It was discovered by Friedrich Wagner in 1982 during neutral-beam heating of the plasma at ASDEX. It has since been reproduced in all major toroidal confinement devices and is planned in the operation of ITER. Its self-consistent theoretical description was a topic of research in 2007. It was still considered a mystery with multiple competing theories (e.g. predator–prey model) in 2016.

History
The  is characterized by relatively large amounts of turbulence, which allows energy to escape the confined plasma. Moreover, it was observed that as the heating power applied to an  plasma increased, the confinement decreased. However, it was discovered in 1982 on the ASDEX tokamak that if the heating power applied using neutral beams was increased beyond a certain critical value, then the plasma spontaneously transitioned into a higher-confinement state.

See also
 Edge-localized mode, an instability of H-mode
 Joint European Torus (JET) operates in H-mode
 COMPASS tokamak can/could operate in H-mode
 KSTAR (South Korea) operates in H-mode
 EAST (China) operates in H-mode
 NSTX-U operates in H-mode

References

Plasma physics